Frank Akers may refer to:

 Frank Peak Akers (1901–1988), American naval admiral
 Frank H. Akers Jr. (born 1944), American army general and lab director for the Oak Ridge National Laboratory